George Henry Powell (27 April 1880 – 3 December 1951) was a Welsh songwriter who, under the pseudonym George Asaf, wrote the lyrics of the marching song "Pack Up Your Troubles in Your Old Kit-Bag" in 1915.
The music was written by his brother Felix Powell, and the song was entered into a World War I competition for "best morale-building song". It won first prize and was noted as "perhaps the most optimistic song ever written". Although Felix Powell was a Staff Sergeant in the British Army, George Powell was a pacifist, and became a conscientious objector when conscription was imposed in 1916.

References

External links
 
  as George Asaf
  as George Henry Powell
 

1880 births
1951 deaths
British songwriters
British conscientious objectors
People from St Asaph